"Philosoph" is a song performed by Austrian singer-songwriter and radio presenter Julian Le Play. The song was released as a digital download on 14 September 2012. The song peaked at number 26 on the Austrian Singles Chart. The song is included on his debut studio album Soweit Sonar (2012).

Music video
A music video to accompany the release of "Philosoph" was first released onto YouTube on 24 October 2012 at a total length of five minutes and fifty seconds.

Track listing

Chart performance

Release history

References

2012 songs
2012 singles
Julian Le Play songs